is a town located in Fukushima Prefecture, Japan. , the town had an estimated population of 8,369 in 3301 households, and a population density of 40 persons per km2.

Geography
Hanawa is located in the southernmost portion of Fukushima prefecture, bordering on Ibaraki Prefecture to the south. 

Mountains: Yamizozan (1021.8m), Yoneyama
Rivers: Kuji River

Climate
Hanawa has a humid climate (Köppen climate classification Cfa).

Neighboring municipalities
 Fukushima Prefecture
 Tanagura
 Yamatsuri
 Samegawa
Ibaraki Prefecture
 Takahagi
 Kitaibaraki
 Hitachiōta

Demographics
Per Japanese census data, the population of Hanawa has been declining over the past 60 years.

History
The area of present-day Hanawa was part of ancient Mutsu Province. Part of the area formed part of the holdings of Tanagura Domain, and part was tenryō territory under direct control of the Tokugawa Shogunate during the Edo period. After the Meiji Restoration, it was organized as part of Higashishirakawa District within the Nakadōri region of Iwaki Province.

Tsunetoyo Village was formed on April 1, 1889 with the creation of the modern municipalities system. It was elevated to town status on November 3, 1948, changing its name to Hanawa at that time. Hanawa annexed the neighboring villages of Sasahara, Ishii and Takagi in March 1955.

Economy
The economy of Hanawa is primarily agricultural. A major crop is Konjac.

Education
Hanawa has three public elementary schools and one combined public middle/high school operated by the town government.

Transportation

Railway
JR East – Suigun Line

Highway

Local attractions
Abukumo Kogen Art Museum

References

External links

 

 
Towns in Fukushima Prefecture